NASFiC, a.k.a. the North American Science Fiction Convention, is a science fiction convention scheduled only during years where the Worldcon is being held outside the North American continent. NASFiC bids are voted on by the membership of the Worldcon (or NASFiC if it exists), the year after a non-North-American Worldcon site has been selected. As of 2014, this is one year in advance of a potential NASFiC, since Worldcon sites are chosen two years in advance.

History
Activities at a NASFiC parallel those seen at Worldcon, but may differ with each convention committee.  The convention may be held as an individual event or in conjunction with another convention.  It generally occurs near the time of the Worldcon, but not in direct competition with it. Fourteen NASFiCs have occurred to date. The name NASFiC is owned by the World Science Fiction Society (WSFS).

The late Robert Sacks led a movement to separate NASFiC from the World Science Fiction Society, similar to Eurocon, but WSFS has chosen to keep NASFiC under its own aegis.

Conventions
This is a list of the NASFiCs held, or scheduled, so far:

References

External links 
 
NASFiC "Long List" – List of NASFiCs with chair(s), guest(s), attendance, etc.

 
Science fiction conventions in the United States